Hugh Hodges (1641 – 16 August 1693) MP  JP was a lawyer and Member of Parliament for Bridport in the reign of James II.

Family and Education
Hodges was educated at Sherborne, of which he became a governor in 1669 and later a benefactor to the library, Queen's College, Oxford and Lincoln's Inn. He was called to the Bar in 1666 and became a bencher of Lincoln's Inn in 1685.

He was joint auditor of excise for Dorset in 1662, commissioner for recusants in 1675, and commissioner for rebels’ estates in Somerset and Dorset in 1685 along with his fellow Old Shirburnian and MP Thomas Wyndham. He became Recorder of Dorchester in 1671, a JP from 1673 to 1688, Recorder of Bridport in 1677 and MP for Bridport in 1685.

Family life
Hodges married Mary, daughter of John Eastmont of Sherborne, with whom he had one son who succeeded him. He died on 16 August 1693 and was buried in Sherborne Abbey, the only member of his family to sit in Parliament.

References

1693 deaths
Alumni of The Queen's College, Oxford
People educated at Sherborne School
Politicians from Dorset
1641 births
Members of the Parliament of England (pre-1707)
English justices of the peace
Members of Lincoln's Inn